Stewart Houston  was a Canadian Anglican priest in the second half of the 19th century and the first decades of the 20th.

Houston was educated at Trinity College, Toronto. Ordained in 1859,  he was a missionary at Mount Forest, Ontario until 1866; and then at Waterdown until 1878. He was then Rector of Niagara Falls  until 1909;Archdeacon of Niagara from 1894 and Dean from 1902. He died on 9 October 1911.

References

Trinity College (Canada) alumni
Archdeacons of Niagara
Deans of Niagara
19th-century Canadian Anglican priests
20th-century Canadian Anglican priests
1911 deaths